Richard Gizbert is a Canadian broadcast journalist. He is the presenter of the Listening Post on Al Jazeera English.

Gizbert was formerly employed by ABC News but was sacked for refusing to travel to Iraq to cover the 2003 U.S. invasion. He later won a case for unfair dismissal against the network.

He is one of six children of transport economist Konrad Studnicki-Gizbert and the grandson of Wladyslaw Studnicki, a Polish politician and publicist with roots in the Polish nobility, the szlachta.

His half-brother, Christopher, is an MIT-trained geologist currently living and working in Calgary, Alberta. Another half-brother, Daviken, is an associate professor of history, specializing in Latin America, at McGill University in Montreal.

Career

Early career
Prior to joining ABC News, Gizbert worked as a correspondent-producer for CJOH-TV in Ottawa, where he produced in-depth features for Sunday Edition, the national current affairs programme. Prior to that, Gizbert was CJOH's parliamentary correspondent for five years, responsible for national political coverage. For his reporting of a hostage situation on Parliament Hill, Gizbert received the National Award for Breaking News Coverage.

From 1983 to 1985, Gizbert was a correspondent and political editor for CFTO-TV in Toronto, covering federal politics and co-presenting special events coverage.

Early articles include a review for Ottawa-based radio station CKCU on Elvis Costello's performance at the Heatwave Festival in 1980.

ABC News
After being fired by ABC News in 2004, Gizbert fought and won a wrongful dismissal case against the network, in which an employment tribunal awarded him $100,000 in compensation. In his legal claim, Gizbert argued that his refusal to accept assignments in Iraq led to his firing. The tribunal agreed, ruling Gizbert's stand on assignments in Iraq was a "primary" reason for his dismissal.

Prior to the case, Gizbert had done extensive work in war zones for ABC. Starting in 1993, he covered the former Yugoslavia, Chechnya, Rwanda and Somalia. In 1999, he says, he told ABC that, as a parent of young children he felt he could no longer accept assignments in war zones. Gizbert told the tribunal that he offered to accept a domestic assignment in the US, if ABC wished him to do so. He said the network decided to keep him in London.

Five years later he was fired by ABC and replaced by a correspondent willing to report from war zones.

According to the UK's Guardian newspaper, Gizbert's legal victory "could have far-reaching effects for war-zone journalism". Jeremy Dear, General Secretary of the National Union of Journalists in Britain, said the victory was "hugely important" for journalists and their families.

Martin Bell, former BBC correspondent and former member of UK parliament, testified on Gizbert's behalf at the tribunal. After the verdict he said "Richard has been very brave, beyond war-zone valour, taking on ABC News. He's taken a stand for young journalists."

Al Jazeera English

Gizbert joined Al Jazeera English after spending 11 years as a London correspondent for ABC News (U.S.), and has been the host of the media-analysis show The Listening Post since the station's launch in 2006.

Aaron Barnhart, TV writer for the Kansas City Star, wrote that Listening Post "might be the best media-critique program in English anywhere." Stewart Purvis, former editor-in-chief and CEO of Britain's ITN, said "The Listening Post has delivered," and that its real value "is the breadth of its monitoring beyond the mainstream".

In 2008, Gizbert also created and hosted Playlist, a show dedicated to "musical fusion, music from the global melting pot".

References

General references
 War and pleas.
 Today's media stories from the papers.
 In brief.
 Today's media stories from the papers.
 TV in the dock at Edinburgh.
 Today's media stories from the papers.
 ABC News denies unfair dismissal claim.
 9/11 a turning point for journalists, court told.
 ABC reporter fights sacking.
 Sacked ABC man was a 'pretty average' reporter.
 ABC News defends itself against unfair dismissal claim.
 ABC London chief denies Iraq link.
 Bell calls for end to 'macho' reporting.
 Reporter's commitments 'at odds' with demands of job.
 Time to end macho journalism, Martin Bell tells tribunal.
 Former ABC man appealed to Jennings.
 Today's media stories from the papers.
 An end to macho war reporting.
 War reporters face 'serious danger', tribunal told.
 Tribunal rules against ABC News.
 Reporter who refused Iraq job wins sacking case.
 ABC to appeal Gizbert ruling.
 Today's media stories from the papers.
 Monday's media stories from the papers.
 Dispatches.
 Gizbert eyes media on al-Jazeera.
 Al-Jazeera International hires Gizbert.
 Accent hindered job search, says sacked reporter.
 ABC execs defend Gizbert sacking.
 Gizbert compensation decision delayed.
 Bell warns on risks for Iraq reporters.
 Appeal questions Iraq threat to Gizbert.
 Gizbert awarded £99,000 compensation.
 ABC wins Gizbert appeal

External links
The Listening Post

Living people
Al Jazeera people
Canadian television journalists
Year of birth missing (living people)